Naria lamarckii, common name the Lamarck's cowrie, is a species of sea snail, a cowry, a marine gastropod mollusk in the family Cypraeidae, the cowries.

Description
The basic color of the oval-shaped, smooth and shiny shells is ochraceous or fulvous, the dorsum shows a clear longitudinal line and it is ocellated with many whitish small spots, while several chestnut or reddish-brown speckles are present on the edges of both sides. The base is mainly whitish, with a long and wide aperture with several teeth. In the living cowries the mantle is well developed, with external antennae.

Distribution
This species is distributed in the East Africa and in the Indian Ocean along Aldabra, Kenya, Madagascar, the Mascarene Basin, Mauritius, Mozambique, Zanzibar, Réunion , the Seychelles, Tanzania, India, Thailand, Singapore, Indonesia and Philippines.

Habitat
As they fear the light, during the day they usually stay in coral caves or under rocks. At dawn or dusk they start feeding on sponges or coral polyps.

Subspecies
 Naria lamarckii fainzilberi Lorenz & Hubert, 1993

 Naria lamarckii lamarckii (Gray, 1825)
 Naria lamarckii redimita Melvill, 1888

References

 Verdcourt, B. (1954). The cowries of the East African Coast (Kenya, Tanganyika, Zanzibar and Pemba). Journal of the East Africa Natural History Society 22(4) 96: 129-144, 17 pls.
 Burgess, C.M. (1970) -  The Living Cowries. AS Barnes and Co, Ltd. Cranbury, New Jersey
 E.L. Heiman - VARIABILITY OF COWRY POPULATIONS - 21. INTRASPECIFIC VARIATION IN EROSARIA LAMARCKII (GRAY, 1825)  Man and mollusk
 Steyn, D.G. & Lussi, M. (1998) Marine Shells of South Africa. An Illustrated Collector's Guide to Beached Shells. Ekogilde Publishers, Hartebeespoort, South Africa, ii + 264 pp. page(s): 64

External links
 Biolib
 Flmnh

Cypraeidae
Gastropods described in 1825
Taxa named by John Edward Gray